Chris Evert-Lloyd was the defending champion and won in the final 6–3, 6–3 against Andrea Jaeger.

Seeds
A champion seed is indicated in bold text while text in italics indicates the round in which that seed was eliminated. The top eight seeds received a bye to the second round.

  Chris Evert-Lloyd (champion)
  Andrea Jaeger (final)
  Wendy Turnbull (semifinals)
  Hana Mandlíková (semifinals)
  Virginia Ruzici (second round)
  Zina Garrison (quarterfinals)
  Kathy Rinaldi (third round)
  Rosalyn Fairbank (quarterfinals)
 n/a
  Andrea Leand (third round)
  Kathy Jordan (second round)
  Leslie Allen (second round)
  JoAnne Russell (third round)
  Catherine Tanvier (first round)
 n/a
 n/a

Draw

Finals

Top half

Section 1

Section 2

Bottom half

Section 3

Section 4

References
 1983 Murjani Cup Draw (Archived 2009-07-31)

Singles